Irma Christina Karlsson (later Wuopio, born 3 June 1946) is a retired Swedish speed skater. She competed in the 1500 and 3000 m events at the 1968 Winter Olympics and finished in 18th and 13th place, respectively.

References

External links
 

1946 births
Living people
Olympic speed skaters of Sweden
Speed skaters at the 1968 Winter Olympics
Swedish female speed skaters